Thomas Yeates (born January 19, 1955) is an American comic strip and comic book artist best known for illustrating the comic strips Prince Valiant and Zorro and for working on characters created by Edgar Rice Burroughs.

Career
Thomas Yeates was part of the first graduating class from The Kubert School. His first published comics work was "Preacher" a five-page backup feature in Sgt. Rock #312 (Jan. 1978). He provided spot illustrations for a Batman prose story in Detective Comics #500 (March 1981) written by Walter B. Gibson, longtime writer of The Shadow. Yeates and Jack C. Harris briefly revived Claw the Unconquered as a backup feature in The Warlord #48-49. "Dragonsword" was a backup feature by Paul Levitz and Yeates which appeared in The Warlord #51-54 (Nov. 1981–Feb. 1982). In 1982, Yeates and writer Martin Pasko revived Swamp Thing in a new series titled Saga of the Swamp Thing. Timespirits was created by Stephen Perry and Yeates for the Epic Comics line. He drew the Universe X: Beasts and Universe X: Cap one-shots for Marvel in 2001. On April 1, 2012, Yeates began drawing the Prince Valiant comic strip, replacing Gary Gianni. Yeates collaborated with Sergio Aragonés and Mark Evanier on the Groo vs. Conan crossover for Dark Horse Comics in 2014.

Awards
Yeates received an Inkpot Award in 2012.

Bibliography

Comico
 Jonny Quest #4 (1986)

Dark Horse Comics
 Conan #1, 3–7, 9–11, 13–14 (2004–2005)
 Dark Horse Presents #143 (1999)
 Dark Horse Presents vol. 2 #8–10 (2012)
 Edgar Rice Burroughs' Tarzan: The Lost Adventure #1 (1995)
 Edgar Rice Burroughs' The Return of Tarzan #1–3 (1997)
 Groo vs. Conan #1–4 (2014)
 Monkeyman and O'Brien July's Greatest Comics #1 (1996)
 Tarzan #1–6, 17–20 (1996–1998)

DC Comics
 
 Arak, Son of Thunder #27–30 (1983–1984) 
 Detective Comics #500 (Batman) (1981) 
 Elvira's House of Mystery #7 (1986) 
 Ghosts #67,89 (1978-1980) 
 House of Mystery #294, 301, 315 (1981–1983) 
 Jonah Hex #53–55 (1981) 
 Mystery in Space #114, 117 (1980–1981) 
 Saga of the Swamp Thing #1–8, 10–13 (1982–1983) 
 Sgt. Rock #312, 331, 340, 346 (1978–1980) 
 Superman #422 (1986) 
 Swamp Thing #64, 86–89, 112–113, Annual #3 (1987–1991) 
 Unknown Soldier #244–246 (1980) 
 Vertigo Visions – Tomahawk #1 (1998) 
 The Warlord #48–49 (Claw the Unconquered); #51–54 (Dragonsword) (1981–1982) 
 Weird War Tales #103 (1981)
 Who's Who: The Definitive Directory of the DC Universe #26 (1987)

Eclipse Comics
 
 Airboy #1–2, 25 (1986–1987)
 Alien Encounters #8 (1986)
 Alien Worlds vol. 2 #1 (1988)
 Aztec Ace #10, 14 (1985)
 Brought to Light #1 (1988)
 Captain EO #1 (adaptation) (1987)
 Licence to Kill #1 (adaptation) (1989)
 Luger #1–3 (1986–1987)
 The New DNAgents #10 (1986)
 Orbit #3 (1990)
 Real War Stories #1 (1987)
 Scout #7, 9 (1986)
 Scout Handbook #1 (1987)
 Scout: War Shaman #10–11 (1989)
 Total Eclipse #2, 4 (1988–1989)

HM Communications, Inc.
 Heavy Metal #v4#7, #v5#5, #v7#10 (1980–1984)

Image Comics
 Zorro: The Dailies, First Year #1 (2001)

Malibu Comics
 Tarzan: The Beckoning #1–7 (1992–1993)

Marvel Comics
 Paradise X: Ragnarok #1–2 (2003) 
 Timespirits #1–8 (1984–1985) 
 Universe X: Beasts #1 (2001) 
 Universe X: Cap #1 (2001) 
 Wild Cards #2 (1990)

Pacific Comics
 Alien Worlds #3, 5 (1983)

Topps Comics
 Dracula Versus Zorro #1–2 (1993)

References

External links
  
 
 Thomas Yeates at Mike's Amazing World of Comics
 Thomas Yeates at the Unofficial Handbook of Marvel Comics Creators

1955 births
20th-century American artists
21st-century American artists
American comics artists
Artists from the San Francisco Bay Area
DC Comics people
Inkpot Award winners
Living people
Marvel Comics people
People from Sonoma County, California
Prince Valiant
The Kubert School alumni